Anderstorp Raceway, previously known as Scandinavian Raceway, is a  motorsport race track in Anderstorp (Gislaved Municipality), Sweden and the sole Nordic host of a Formula One World Championship Grand Prix, when the Swedish Grand Prix was held for six years between 1973 and 1978.

Track history
The track was built on marshlands in 1968 and became an extremely popular venue in the 1970s, just as Swede Ronnie Peterson was at the height of his career. It has a long straight (called Flight Straight, which is also used as an aircraft runway), as well as several banked corners, making car setup an engineering compromise. Unusually, the pit lane is located halfway round the lap.

The raceway hosted six Formula One Swedish Grand Prix events in the 1970s.  When Peterson and Gunnar Nilsson died during the 1978 Formula One season, public support for the event dried up and the Swedish Grand Prix came to an end. The circuit is also noteworthy because it was the site of the first and only win of two unconventional F1 cars: the six-wheeled Tyrrell P34 car in 1976 and the infamous Brabham 'fan car' in 1978.

Anderstorp also hosted the Swedish motorcycle Grand Prix in 1971–1977 and 1981–1990, the European Touring Car Championship in 1985–1987, the Superbike World Championship in 1991 and 1993, and the FIA GT Championship in 2002 and 2003. 

In 1993 circuit alongside FIM organized 24-hour motorcycle race. Just one week ahead of the race, "an appeal was lodged against the permit for the competition", due to noise concerns. Although the race got permition to start with just one day left to start the event, "media had trumpeted that the competition was canceled. At the ferry berths in Skåne, passport staff turned visitors from Denmark and the continent". During the race itself heavy storm began falling over the site of the circuit and although racing continued, no audience showed up, and the circuit after the event declared bankruptcy. 

The FIA World Touring Car Championship (WTCC) returned to Anderstorp in 2007, replacing the Istanbul Park in Turkey on the WTCC calendar. For the 2008 season however, it was replaced by the Imola Circuit.

International motorsport was due to return to Anderstorp in 2020 with a round of the DTM. Then, it was cancelled due to COVID-19 pandemic.

Events

 Current

 May: Porsche Carrera Cup Scandinavia, GT4 Scandinavia, TCR Scandinavia, F4 Danish Championship

 Former

 BPR Global GT Series (1995–1996)
 EuroBOSS Series (2009)
 European Formula 5000 Championship (1970)
 European Touring Car Championship (1985–1987, 2002–2003)
 FIA European Formula 3 Cup (1975)
 FIA GT Championship (2002–2003)
 FIA Sportscar Championship (1998)
 FIM Endurance World Championship (1993)
 Formula 750 (1973, 1975)
 Formula One Swedish Grand Prix (1973–1978)
 Formula Renault V6 Eurocup (2003)
 Grand Prix motorcycle racing Swedish motorcycle Grand Prix (1971–1977, 1981–1990)
 Scandinavian Touring Car Championship (1997–2000, 2005–2007, 2015–2022)
 Sidecar World Championship (1981–1990, 1993, 1997)
 SMP F4 Championship (2016)
 Superbike World Championship (1991, 1993)
 World Touring Car Championship FIA WTCC Race of Sweden (2007)

Layout modifications

The circuit has been modified at least 4 times in its history. The chicane in Norra corner has been added sometime in 1975 before the 1975 Swedish Grand Prix. The chicane has been re-aligned and tightened in time for the 1976 Swedish Grand Prix.

Track variations:
  – 1968–1974
  – 1975–1977
  – 1978–1997
  – 1998–present

Lap records
The official fastest race lap records at the Anderstorp Raceway are listed as:

Airfield
In order to get more financiers the long straight was adopted as a  runway for small aircraft . It is  open for aircraft operations. There is also a helipad, planned for ambulance helicopters at racing accidents.

Notes
 Contrary to common depiction of the 1978 modification as having a chicane introduced to the Norra corner, there was no chicane ever used: the corner was made slower by decreasing its radius and making it a sharper bend instead of a sweeping curve it was before.

References

External links

 Anderstorp Racing Club 
 Satellite picture by Google Maps

Superbike World Championship circuits
Formula One circuits
Scandinavian Raceway
Anderstorp
Motorsport venues in Sweden
Buildings and structures in Jönköping County
World Touring Car Championship circuits
1968 establishments in Sweden
Airports in Sweden